Jennifer Ng Chi Kwon (born 1985) is a national team freestyle swimmer from Hong Kong. She has swum for Hong Kong at the 2002 Asian Games, 2002 Pan Pacs, and the 2003 World Championships. She trained in college at Canada's University of British Columbia.

References

1985 births
Living people
Hong Kong female freestyle swimmers
Swimmers at the 2002 Asian Games
Asian Games competitors for Hong Kong